Dancing bans are legal or religious prohibitions against dancing, which have been applied at various times in various jurisdictions around the world. This article deals with general bans on recreational and artistic dancing, as opposed to bans on erotic forms of dancing such as lap dancing and topless dancing, which have been more common.

Legal bans
Tanzverbot is the German term for "dancing ban". In Germany and Switzerland, dancing on some holidays is banned by most state or canton governments. These occasions are certain Christian and secular holidays aimed at mourning or contemplation, such as Good Friday, All Saints' Day (from its association with All Souls' Day practices) or memorial days like Volkstrauertag. The German and Swiss dancing bans prohibit public parties, but not dancing in one's private residence.

Until 1999, an ordinance in Pound, Virginia required that dance hall permits not be granted "to anyone who is not a proper person, nor to a person who is not a person of good moral character". After community opposition to granting him a permit, a lawsuit by William Elam, owner of the Golden Pine restaurant, resulted in the ordinance being struck down as unconstitutionally vague and infringing on free expression protected by the First Amendment to the United States Constitution. A replacement ordinance drafted more narrowly prompted a 2001 lawsuit from Elam, though the restaurant later went out of business after revocation of its alcohol license.

Since 1926, the New York City Cabaret Law prohibited dancing in all spaces open to the public that sold food and/or drink with the exception of those who obtain a cabaret license. This law was still enforced until it was repealed in 2017. 

Between 1985 and 2002, a Seattle, Washington law called the Teen Dance Ordinance enacted strict legal requirements for those wishing to have dancing by youth under the age of 21, effectively banning events that would feature young people dancing.

Historic bans
From the 1830s to 1950s, play parties became popular as a means to circumvent restrictions on dancing.

The events of the 1984 film Footloose were inspired by a dancing ban in the heavily Southern Baptist town of Elmore City, Oklahoma, which lasted until 1980.

COVID-19 public health measures 
During the COVID-19 pandemic, a number of jurisdictions specifically prohibited dancing as part of a suite of public health measures designed to prevent close contact between potential spreaders of the virus.

Religious bans

Christianity
Various Christian groups believe that dancing is either inherently sinful or that certain forms of dancing could lead to sinful thoughts or activities, and thus proscribe it either in general or during religious services, particularly in the Anabaptist (chiefly Conservative Anabaptist and Old Order Anabaptist denominations) and Methodist (chiefly denominations belonging to the conservative holiness movement) traditions.

The Church of the Nazarene, a Methodist denomination originating in the Holiness Movement, recommends against "All forms of dancing that detract from spiritual growth and break down proper moral inhibitions and reserve." 

A 19th-century Catholic theologian similarly teaches:

Many Christian churches determine doctrine locally and may be non-denominational, and these vary on their stances on social dancing.

In contrast, some strains of Charismatic Christianity practice rituals in which the Holy Spirit is believed to cause spontaneous dancing, among other behaviors. 

It is a common misconception that Mormonism has banned dancing, when in fact it has advocated dance and participated in recreational dancing since it was organized in 1830. Founder Joseph Smith was a skillful dancer and enjoyed hosting dances in his home. Dancing continues as an integral part of youth and adult activities in the Church.

Islam
In Islam, extreme Salafists and Wahhabis consider dancing in general to be haram (forbidden). Conservative Islamic and Orthodox Jewish traditions prohibit contact between men and women in public (especially those not married to each other), and thus in these societies men and women either dance separately or not at all.

In contrast, Sufism encourages dancing, for example Sufi whirling and dancing to celebrate Mela Chiraghan. This has resulted in conflict in areas influenced by the Taliban.

See also
 Businesses Affecting Public Morals Regulation Act, which restricted dancing in Japan
 New York City Cabaret (No Dancing) Law
 Sumptuary law
 Talibanization
 Seku Amadu
 Pai, Thailand
 The Brass Rail (Toronto) – subject to lap dance ban, since overturned

References

Legal history
Ban
Religious controversies